Sudislav nad Orlicí is a municipality and village in Ústí nad Orlicí District in the Pardubice Region of the Czech Republic. It has about 100 inhabitants.

Administrative parts
The hamlet of Orlík is an administrative part of Sudislav nad Orlicí.

References

Villages in Ústí nad Orlicí District